Giacomo Ricci (born 2 September 1996) is an Italian professional footballer who plays as a full back for  club Bari.

Career
He made his Serie C debut for Parma on 17 September 2016 in a game against Pordenone. He remained with the club as it was promoted three times from Serie D up to Serie A.

On 28 August 2019, he joined Juve Stabia on loan with an option to buy.

On 10 January 2021, he made his debut for Parma in Serie A in a 2–0 home loss against Lazio.

On 30 January 2021, Ricci joined Venezia on loan.

On 31 August 2021, he signed a two-year contract with Bari.

Career statistics

Honours
Bari
 Serie C: 2021–22 (Group C)

References

External links
 

1996 births
Living people
Sportspeople from Livorno
Italian footballers
Association football defenders
Serie A players
Serie B players
Serie C players
Serie D players
U.S. Livorno 1915 players
Parma Calcio 1913 players
A.S. Pro Piacenza 1919 players
Carrarese Calcio players
S.S. Juve Stabia players
Venezia F.C. players
S.S.C. Bari players
Footballers from Tuscany